Néstor Ahuad (7 April 1940 – 1 October 2016) was an Argentine politician who served as governor of La Pampa Province from 1987 to 1991.

References

1940 births
2016 deaths
Governors of La Pampa Province
Justicialist Party politicians